Hymns for the Haunted is the third studio album by Swedish recording artist Amanda Jenssen. The song "The Carnival" was used on American Horror Story: Freak Show.  Jenssen described the album as both “Voodoo Jazz” and “Jungle Jazz”.

Track listing

Charts

Weekly charts

Year-end charts

References

2012 albums
Amanda Jenssen albums